The 1989 Jamba Hercules crash was an air accident involving a Lockheed Hercules L-100 aircraft that crashed on final approach to Jamba, Cuando Cubango, Angola on 27 November 1989. The flight had originated at Kamina Airport, Zaire, and was attempting a low-level approach at night. The aircraft was owned by CIA front company Tepper Aviation; it was delivering arms to UNITA. The crash killed "Bud" Peddy, the head of Tepper Aviation, who was acting as the plane's pilot. On board were several Americans, two West Germans, and a Briton. All were killed in the crash.

References

Aviation accidents and incidents in 1989
Angola–United States relations
1989 in Angola 
Central Intelligence Agency operations
UNITA
Aviation accidents and incidents in Angola
Arms trafficking
November 1989 events in Africa
Accidents and incidents involving the Lockheed C-130 Hercules
Angolan Civil War
1989 disasters in Angola